FINEX SOLUTIONS, or Finex may refer to:

Finex, database product of Technimetrics
FINEX (steelmaking process), steel making process
Toyota Fine-X, "Fuel cell INnovation Emotion-eXperiment", a concept car from 2005.